Bridgeview Vineyard and Winery is one of the largest wineries in Oregon.  Located in Cave Junction, Oregon, Bridgeview is noted for their chardonnay, pinot gris and pinot noir.  Its  estate in the Illinois Valley is planted in the European style of dense six-foot row and four-foot vine spacing.  Bridgeview also has an  vineyard in the Applegate Valley.

History

Bridgeview produces midmarket wines in the varietals of Chardonnay, Gewürztraminer, Muscat, Pinot gris, Pinot noir, and Riesling. Bridgeview is most famous for their line of "Blue Moon" Riesling, Chardonnay and Pinot noir. Other lines include Black Beauty Merlot and a Premium line that includes Reserve Pinot gris and Reserve Pinot noir.

Bob and Lelo Kerivan have remained as the head of what is still very much a family business.  Staying true to what has made them successful and a neverending passion for something they enjoy turns the chores of wine making to more than a profession, but for them a way of living. Lelo has been quoted as saying; "If I saw this as work, I wouldn't do it!" 
 
Bridgeview introduced blue bottles for their "Blue Moon" Riesling and "Blue Moon" Chardonnay, and by using colored, recyclable synthetic corks in some of their bottles.

Blue Moon Riesling

Brideviews Blue Moon Riesling comes in a cobalt blue bottle, that according to Frank J. Prial of The New York Times is an instant attention grabber.  The cork is made from the same material used in artificial heart valves, has a brandname of Supremecorq, and is also cobalt blue.  Wine Enthusiast Magazine noted the "edgieness" of the bottle while recommending Bridgeview's 2002 Blue Moon Riesling, giving it a score of 87.

References

Further reading

External links
 Awards won by Bridgeview Vineyard and Winery at bridgeview.com

Wineries in Oregon
Companies based in Cave Junction, Oregon
American companies established in 1986
1986 establishments in Oregon